Milton Ness is a coastal landform along the coast of the North Sea approximately two miles south of the village of Johnshaven, Scotland.  This headland feature includes a red sandstone cliff formation.  Certain prehistoric features are found in the vicinity of Milton Ness, including the Stone of Morphie located somewhat to the west.

References

Headlands of Scotland
Landforms of Aberdeenshire